Palau competed at the 2011 Pacific Games in Nouméa, New Caledonia between August 27 and September 10, 2011. As of June 28, 2011 Palau has listed 66 competitors.

Athletics

Palau has qualified 6 athletes.

Men
Jersey Lyar
Leon Mengloi
Jacques Stills
John Stills
Rodman Teltull

Women
Ruby Gabriel

Baseball

Palau has qualified a team.  Each team can have a maximum of 20 athletes.

Men -  Team Tournament
Herman Alfonso
Avery Amos Olkebai
Blaluk Conseko Anthony
Lieb Kubek Bells
Rodrick Aquino Blanco
Kalson Dulei
O'leary Wataru Ise
Carter Smau Kahue
Reagan Sidoi
Melngis Andre Uchel
L'Amour Lansang Arurang
Antonio Ngiralmau
Lantz Ngiramengior
Royce Elbuchel Sadang
Raynold Bkudasu Sadang
Isimang Tillion Smus

Canoeing

Palau has qualified 9 athletes.

Men
O'Quinn Sakuma

Women
Pauleen Kumangai
Pkngey Otobed
Joyleen Baklai Temengil
Marina Toribiong
Debra Ann Toriboing
Jacqualine Ngirdimau
Elsei Diane Tellei
Joy Kukumai Ueki Uong

Swimming

Palau has qualified 2 athletes.

Women
Osisang Chilton
Keesha Keane

Table Tennis

Palau has qualified 2 athletes.

Men
Samuel Saunders
Dillon Meriang

Volleyball

Beach Volleyball

Palau has qualified a men's and women's team.  Each team can consist of a maximum of 2 members.

Men
Christopher Carlos
Kingsley Ngirmidol

Women
Holly Yamada
Hila Asanuma

Weightlifting

Palau has qualified 2 athletes.

Men
Patris Stevick -  -62 kg Clean & Jerk,  -62 kg Snatch,  -62 kg Total
Dmitri Villanueva

References

Nations at the 2011 Pacific Games
Palau at the Pacific Games
Pacific